Mirăslău is a commune located in Alba County, Transylvania, Romania. It has a population of 1,985 (2011). The commune is composed of six villages: Cicău (Csákó), Decea (Marosdécse), Lopadea Veche (Oláhlapád), Mirăslău, Ormeniș (Marosörményes) and Rachiș (Oláhrákos).

The commune lies at the western edge of the Transylvanian Plateau, on the banks of the Mureș River. It is situated in the northern part of Alba County,  from the city of Aiud, on the border with Cluj County. 

The A10 motorway runs through Decea, parallel to DN1. The Mirăslău train station serves the CFR Line 300, which runs from Bucharest to Brașov, Teiuș, Cluj-Napoca, and on to the Hungarian border.

Mirăslău is the site of a battle in 1600 between the Wallachian army led by Michael the Brave and the Hungarian noblemen supported by the Austrian general Giorgio Basta (see Battle of Mirăslău).

At the 2011 census, 67.5% of inhabitants were Romanians, 27.8% Hungarians and 4.5% Roma. At the 2002 census, 66.4% were Romanian Orthodox, 25% Reformed and 4% Greek-Catholic.

References

Communes in Alba County
Localities in Transylvania